Irv Drasnin is an American journalist, a producer-director-writer of documentary films for CBS News and PBS (Frontline, The American Experience, Nova). Among the awards he has received for broadcast journalism are the duPont-Columbia, the Directors Guild (DGA), the Writers Guild (WGA), and the American Film and Video Blue Ribbon.

Films

Early life 
Irv Drasnin was born in Charleston, West Virginia, on March 18, 1934, a son of immigrants: his father, Joseph, a U.S. Treasury Agent, was from Tsarist Russia, as was his mother, Clara Aaron. The family moved to Los Angeles when he was four years old. His oldest brother, Sid, was an architect, remembered (with Lloyd Wright) for the Wayfarer's Chapel in Palo Verdes, California, and for The Gardens of the World in Thousand Oaks, California.  His brother Bob played clarinet, sax and flute with the Les Brown Orchestra and Red Norvo quintet among others, performed in Carnegie Hall as a classical musician, was the director of music at CBS, and a composer and teacher.

Education 
Drasnin is a graduate of Carthay Center Elementary School, John Burroughs Junior High School and Los Angeles High School (1952). He has a BA in political science from UCLA, where he was student body president (1955–56); editor of The Daily Bruin (for which the paper was awarded an All-American rating as one of the top five college dailies in the country); and Men's Representative to the Student Council (1954). He also was a member of Project India (1954), one of twelve students selected each year to spend the summer in India, speaking about America and interacting with Indian college students.

He has a MA from Harvard in East Asian Studies (1957–59) with a specialization in China. He taught in the Master's Film Program at Stanford University (1980–82).

Career

United Press International 

He began his career as a reporter at United Press International, in Pittsburgh, Pennsylvania, the eastern division news headquarters (1959–60), where the stories he covered included the steelworkers strike of 1959, the visits of Soviet leaders Kozlov and Khrushchev, Wightman Cup Tennis. He wrote both for newspapers and radio.

CBS News Broadcasts 
In 1961 he was hired by CBS News as a writer for daily news broadcasts, becoming a producer for Calendar, a public affairs program with Harry Reasoner; and the CBS Evening News with Walter Cronkite. His assignments for the evening news covered major news events, including the civil rights movement. He was the producer of CBS News coverage in Selma, Alabama including "Bloody Sunday" (March 1965) and for the Senate passage of the Voting Rights Act that followed. Other assignments included the Republican Convention of 1964, the successful presidential campaign of Lyndon Johnson, the funeral of Winston Churchill in London, the space program (the Mercury 6 flight of Wally Schirra), and the World Series, Dodgers vs the Orioles, Cardinals vs. the Red Sox.

Documentary film years at CBS News and PBS 
CBS News, 1966–79. PBS, 1982–92, for Frontline, The American Experience and Nova.

His thirty documentaries include a chronicle of modern China beginning with Misunderstanding China (CBS News), Shanghai (CBS News), Looking for Mao (PBS/Frontline), China After Tiananmen (PBS/Frontline) and The Revolutionary, an independent feature-length film.

When US-China relations were restored in 1972 after a 20-year hiatus, each of the three U.S. television networks was allowed access to film a documentary. Drasnin drew the assignment for CBS News, spending ten-weeks inside the country to make the film Shanghai. In 1991, he reported in depth from China in the wake of the government's violent crackdown on student-led demonstrations in Beijing's Tiananmen Square, China After Tiananmen.

His foreign reporting also covered southern Africa and the last stands of white colonial rule in Who's Got A Right to Rhodesia (CBS News) and in Apartheid (PBS/Frontline).

Mr. Drasnin's domestic topics include The Guns of Autumn (CBS News), You and the Commercial (CBS News), Health in America (CBS News), Inside the Union (CBS News), The Radio Priest (PBS/The American Experience), The Chip vs The Chess Master (PBS/Nova), and Forever Baseball (PBS/The American Experience.).

Personal life 
He is married to Xiaoyan Zhao, former senior vice president and global polling director for New York-based GfK Roper Public Affairs. The couple has lived in New York City (1987–1996) and Hong Kong (1997–1998) where Xiaoyan was the founding managing director of Roper's Asia-Pacific Headquarters. They now reside in Los Altos, California.

Awards

Other 
He was a founding member and then co-chair of the China Council of The Asia Society in New York (1980–82). His public speaking engagements include The National Press Club, The Chicago Council of Foreign Relations, the Kansas City International Relations Council, the National Photographers Association, The Foreign Correspondents Clubs of Beijing, of Shanghai, and of Hong Kong, of which he is a member, universities and civic groups.

For the Academy of Achievement, he has interviewed more than a hundred notable recipients from the arts and literature, the sciences, business, politics, and sports. They include: Mikhail Gorbachev, Desmond Tutu, Ehud Barak, Justice Anthony Kennedy, Rep. John Lewis, Colin Powell, Sally Ride, Timothy Berners-Lee, Stephen Jay Gould, Maya Lin, Amy Tan, Edward Albee, James Michener, George Lucas, James Earl Jones, Wynton Marsalis, Quincy Jones, B. B. King, Kareem Abdul-Jabbar, Willie Mays, and John Wooden.

References

External links 
 
 Assignment China, Irv Drasnin on YouTube Covering China
 
 UCLA Historical Roster of Elected Student Body Officers

Living people
1934 births
CBS News people
PBS people
21st-century American screenwriters
21st-century American journalists
20th-century American screenwriters
20th-century American journalists
American male journalists
Directors Guild of America Award winners
Writers Guild of America Award winners
People from Charleston, West Virginia
Los Angeles High School alumni
University of California, Los Angeles alumni
Harvard College alumni
Stanford University Department of Art and Art History faculty